TAC is an open source instant messaging and chat client program written by AOL which uses the TOC protocol used by the AOL Instant Messenger system. It is written in Tcl, and is a command line client. It is a command line version of the GUI TiK client which is written in Tcl/Tk. Developing of TAC and TiK began around 1998 or so. The software is no longer developed by AOL since 1999. Several independent developers have released some new versions of the software. However, at the time of this writing no new versions had been released for several years.

Meaning of acronym
The name TAC is said to stand for "TAC, another client".

External links
TAC Independent Development Website

AOL
Free software programmed in Tcl
Instant messaging server software